Marcos Alvarez (born 30 September 1991) is a German professional footballer who plays as a striker for  club SV Meppen.

Career
Alvarez joined 3. Liga club SV Meppen on 1 February 2023, after training with the club for a week. He signed a contract until summer 2024.

Honours
Cracovia
 Polish Super Cup: 2020

References

External links
 
 

1991 births
Living people
People from Gelnhausen
German people of Spanish descent
Sportspeople from Darmstadt (region)
German footballers
Footballers from Hesse
Association football forwards
Germany youth international footballers
Bundesliga players
2. Bundesliga players
3. Liga players
Ekstraklasa players
III liga players
Kickers Offenbach players
Eintracht Frankfurt players
Eintracht Frankfurt II players
FC Bayern Munich II players
Stuttgarter Kickers players
VfL Osnabrück players
Dynamo Dresden players
MKS Cracovia (football) players
SV Meppen players
German expatriate footballers
German expatriate sportspeople in Poland
Expatriate footballers in Poland